Marcel Letestu (8 April 191829 August 2006) was a Général de brigade of the French Army  and Commandant of the Foreign Legion.

Military career 
Marcel enlisted in the French Army in 1936 and became a Sergent (Sergeant) in 1938. A Sous-Officiers in the Franc Corps of the 160th Infantry Regiment in 1939 to 1940 at the front, he was made captive during the Phoney War. He managed to escape a stalag and joined the free zone.

He entered to the École militaire interarmes of Cherchell. He graduated as a Major of his promotion.

At the end of war, he was named as an instructor at the Perfection Officer School of Achern. In 1950, he was the champion of France for precision shooting and recordman for rapid shooting.

Promoted Captain in 1951, he joined the 5th Foreign Infantry Regiment 5e REI where he was cited and wounded in 1952.

He then served in Algeria where he commanded a battalion of the 1st Foreign Regiment 1e RE. He was then assigned to the École spéciale militaire de Saint-Cyr, where he commanded a company prior to assuming the role of an infantry instructor.

Promoted to Chef de bataillon (Commandant -Major) in 1958, he commanded a general staff headquarters Division of the 3rd Foreign Infantry Regiment 3e REI in the Sud-Oranais. He then commanded the Foreign at Madagascar, prior to becoming the regimental commander of the 1st Foreign Regiment 1e RE in 1970. During his tenure, the Operational Group of the Foreign Legion G.O.L.E was created, then in 1972, the Foreign Legion Groupment G.L.E at Aubagne and the 2nd Foreign Infantry Regiment 2e REI, leading to the formation of the Commandement de la Légion Étrangère which he assumed the first command.

He left the command of the Legion in 1973 to command, in 1974, the 23rd Territorial Military Division. He left active duty service in 1976.

Since 22 October 1977, général Letestu is the Patron of the École militaire interarmes promotion « Lieutenant Chezeau » (E.M.I.A 1977-1978) of the 1st Parachute Hussard Regiment 1er RHP.

Recognitions and Honors 

  Grand-croix de la Légion d'honneur
  Croix de guerre 1939-1945
  Croix de guerre des théâtres d'opérations extérieures 
  Croix de la Valeur militaire
  Croix du combattant volontaire
  Croix du combattant
  Médaille des évadés
 8 decorations

He was commended 13 times, 8 of which were in the Armed Forces order.

See also 
Major (France)
French Foreign Legion Music Band (MLE)
Jacques Lefort
Pierre Jeanpierre
Pierre Darmuzai
Saharan Méharistes Companies (méharistes sahariennes)

References

Sources 
 History and Patrimony Division of the French Foreign Legion

1918 births
2006 deaths
People from Joué-lès-Tours
French generals
Officers of the French Foreign Legion
French military personnel of the Algerian War
French military personnel of World War II